Dakota House (born February 17, 1974) is a Canadian actor, politician, writer and activist. House is most noted for his role as Trevor "Teevee" Tenia in the television drama series North of 60, for which he was a Gemini Award nominee for Best Supporting Actor in a Drama Series at the 10th Gemini Awards in 1996. Dakota house has 6 kids.

Career 
House has continued to have occasional acting roles, including in the films Dreamkeeper and One Dead Indian, and guest appearances in the television series MythQuest, Heartland and Blackstone.

In 2019, House stood as a candidate in the 2019 Alberta general election, campaigning for the Alberta Party in the electoral district of Peace River. In 2020, he appeared in a public service announcement on behalf of Edmonton's Ben Calf Robe Society, promoting a suicide prevention hotline program targeted to First Nations.

Personal life 
During his time on North of 60, House struggled with alcohol addiction, and went through several brushes with the law including a charge of spousal abuse against his wife in 1994, and an impaired driving arrest in 1995. In 1997 he was physically attacked by four men in his apartment building, suffering serious injuries including a skull fracture and the loss of part of his ear.

After giving up alcohol he launched Going Miles, a self-help and mentorship group for indigenous youth. In 2002, he published Dancers in the Sky, a children's book based on traditional Cree story about the origins of the aurora borealis. House has 6 kids, One of his sons is a designer, Dredon House.

Filmography

Film

Television

Electoral record

References

1974 births
20th-century Canadian male actors
21st-century Canadian male actors
21st-century Canadian male writers
Canadian male film actors
Canadian male television actors
Canadian children's writers
First Nations male actors
First Nations activists
Cree people
Alberta Party candidates in Alberta provincial elections
Male actors from Alberta
People from Manning, Alberta
Living people
Canadian actor-politicians